This is a list of recipients of the Léon Bernard Foundation Prize awarded by World Health Organization (WHO). 

Established in 1937 in memory of Professor Léon Bérard (1876–1960), one of the founders of the League of Nations, to celebrate outstanding service in the field of social medicine. The prize is awarded when there is enough funding, consisting of a bronze medal and a sum of 2500 CHF to be awarded to a person who has accomplished it.

List of recipients

See also 

 List of Ihsan Doğramacı Family Health Foundation Prize laureates
 List of Sasakawa Health Prize laureates
 List of United Arab Emirates Health Foundation Prize laureates
 List of Sheikh Sabah Al-Ahmad Al-Jaber Al-Sabah Prize laureates

 List of Dr LEE Jong-wook Memorial Prize for Public Health laureates
 List of Dr A.T. Shousha Foundation Prize and Fellowship laureates
 List of The State of Kuwait Prize for the Control of Cancer, Cardiovascular Diseases and Diabetes in the Eastern Mediterranean Region laureates
 List of Jacques Parisot Foundation Fellowship laureates
 List of The Darling Foundation Prize laureates

References 

World Health Organization
Public health
Léon Bernard Foundation Prize laureates